The Enterprise Bankruptcy Law of the People's Republic of China (trial Implementation) was first passed in 1986.  On 1 June 2007, the new Enterprise Bankruptcy Law of the PRC came into force.  It contains 136 articles, almost 100 more than the 1986 law it replaced, and consequently it is thought to be more complete legally.

The Enterprise Bankruptcy Law of the PRC was adopted on August 27, 2006, and became effective since June 1, 2007.

Personal bankruptcy laws only exist in Hong Kong and Shenzhen.

Contents

    Chapter 1 General Provisions
    Chapter 2 Application and Acceptance
       Section 1 Application
       Section 2 Acceptance
    Chapter 3 Administrator
    Chapter 4 Debtor's Property
    Chapter 5 Expenses for Bankruptcy Proceedings and Debts of Common Benefits
    Chapter 6 Declaration of Credits
    Chapter 7 Creditors' Meeting
       Section 1 General Provisions
       Section 2 Creditors' Committee
    Chapter 8 Reorganization
       Section 1 Application for and Period of Reorganization
       Section 2 Preparation and Approval of Reorganization Plan
       Section 3 Execution of Reorganization Plan
    Chapter 9 Composition
    Chapter 10 Bankruptcy Liquidation
       Section 1 Declaration of Bankruptcy
       Section 2 Appraisal and Distribution
       Section 3 Termination of Bankruptcy Proceedings
    Chapter 11 Legal Liability
    Chapter 12 Supplementary Provisions

The Enterprise Bankruptcy Law of the PRC 2007 applies only to the mainland of China. Due to the "One Country, Two Systems" policy of the PRC, different laws and regulations regarding to bankruptcy apply in Hong Kong and Macau.

References

External links
 China's New Bankruptcy Law 
 The Enterprise Bankruptcy Law of the People's Republic of China (Trial Implementation)—passed 2 December 1989, effective until 1 June 2007
 The Enterprise Bankruptcy Law of the People's Republic of China—passed 27 August 2006, effective 1 June 2007
 The full text of the code (Mandarin) http://www.gov.cn/ziliao/flfg/2006-08/28/content_371296.htm

Chinese business law
C
China